Vladlen Yuriyovych Yurchenko (born 22 January 1994) is a Ukrainian professional footballer who plays for Vorskla Poltava.

Club career

Bayer 04 Leverkusen
On 27 June 2014, Bayer 04 Leverkusen confirmed the signing of Vladlen Yurchenko from FC Shakhtar Donetsk on a two-year deal, with the club holding the option to extend the deal. Yurchenko became Leverkusen's fifth acquisition of the 2014 summer, following in the footsteps of Tin Jedvaj, Dario Krešić, Wendell and Josip Drmić. "With Vladlen Yurchenko we have again signed a big talent, hoping that he will make the next step in his development here," said sporting director Rudi Völler. "This transfer fits our philosophy perfectly, as we like to give young players a chance to prove themselves at a high level."

On 11 May 2018, Bayer 04 Leverkusen announced that Yurchenko would leave the club at the end of 2017–18 season.

Vejle Boldklub
On 27 September 2018, Vejle Boldklub announced that they signed Yurchenko on a three-year deal. He left the club at the end of the season.

Zorya Luhansk
On 17 July 2019, Yurchenko signed a two-year contract with Zorya Luhansk in the Ukrainian Premier League. In the 2019–20 season he played 5 matches in the UEFA Europa League, scoring 1 goal. Zorya Luhansk ended up in third position in the 2019–20 Ukrainian Premier League and qualified for the 2020–21 UEFA Europa League, in which he would go on to play 6 matches and score 1 goal. In the 2020–21 season he reached the Ukrainian Cup final, where his team lost 1–0 to Dynamo Kyiv at the Roman Shukhevych Ternopil city stadium.

Desna Chernihiv
On 30 September 2021, he signed for the Ukrainian Premier League side Desna Chernihiv. On 3 October, he made his debut against his former club, Zorya Luhansk, replacing Levan Arveladze in the 76th minute. On 5 December 2021, he scored his first goal for the club against Mariupol at the Chernihiv Stadium. On 22 December Yurchenko terminated his contract with Desna Chernihiv.

Riga
On 25 January 2022, he signed for Riga in the Latvian Higher League. On 5 April, he scored his first goal for the side against Spartaks Jūrmala at the Skonto Stadium.

International career
Yurchenko has represented Ukraine at every youth level from under-16 to under-21. Yurchenko was called up to the senior squad for a 2018 FIFA World Cup qualification match against Iceland on 5 September 2016 but did not appear in the match.

Career statistics

Club

Honours
Riga FC
 Latvian Higher League: Runner-up 2022

Zorya Luhansk
 Ukrainian Cup runner-up: 2020–21

Ukraine U21
 Commonwealth of Independent States Cup: 2014

References

External links 
 Profile on Official FC Desna Chernihiv website
 
 

1994 births
Living people
Ukrainian footballers
Ukraine youth international footballers
Ukraine under-21 international footballers
Ukrainian expatriate footballers
Ukrainian expatriate sportspeople in Germany
FC Shakhtar Donetsk players
FC Shakhtar-3 Donetsk players
Bayer 04 Leverkusen players
FC Mariupol players
Ukrainian Premier League players
Ukrainian Second League players
Bundesliga players
Danish Superliga players
Latvian Higher League players
Expatriate footballers in Germany
Association football midfielders
Sportspeople from Mykolaiv
Vejle Boldklub players
Expatriate men's footballers in Denmark
Ukrainian expatriate sportspeople in Denmark
FC Zorya Luhansk players
FC Desna Chernihiv players
Riga FC players
FC Vorskla Poltava players
Expatriate footballers in Latvia
Ukrainian expatriate sportspeople in Latvia